Better Than a Thousand was an American hardcore band featuring former Youth of Today singer Ray Cappo, Graham Land and Ken Olden of Battery fame. It was a side project of Shelter. Cappo originally intended just to record a couple songs with some friends but it spawned three world tours and two albums.

Members 
 Ray Cappo – vocals
 Graham Land – guitar
 Jeff Neumann – bass
 Ken Olden – drums

Discography 

 Splits 
 Better Than a Thousand / 28 Days 7" (1998, DEA)
 Better Than a Thousand / Face of Change 7" (1998, DEA)

 Compilation appearances 
Fight The World, Not Each Other (A Tribute to 7 Seconds) – "In Your Face"
The Rebirth of Hardcore: 1999 – "I Can Make a Difference / Out of Fashion"
Anti-Racist Action: Stop Racism the benefit CD – "Poison in Your Brain (LFKB remix)"

External links 
Revelation Records
Epitaph Records

Hardcore punk groups from Washington, D.C.
Revelation Records artists
End Hits Records artists